Chislehurst is a suburban district of south-east London, England, in the London Borough of Bromley. Before the creation of Greater London in 1965, it was in Kent.

History

The name "Chislehurst" is derived from the Saxon words cisel, "gravel", and hyrst, "wooded hill".

The Walsingham family, including Christopher Marlowe's patron, Sir Thomas Walsingham and Queen Elizabeth I's spymaster, Francis Walsingham, had a home in Scadbury Park, now a nature reserve in which the ruins of the house can still be seen.

A water tower used to straddle the road from Chislehurst to Bromley until it was demolished in 1963 as one of the last acts of the Chislehurst and Sidcup UDC. It marked the entrance to the Wythes Estate in Bickley, but its narrow archway meant that double-decker buses were not able to be used on the route.

Governance
The Chislehurst civil parish formed an urban district of Kent from 1894 to 1934. In 1934 it became part of the Chislehurst and Sidcup Urban District, which was split in 1965 between the London boroughs of Bromley and Bexley. Chislehurst Ward has three councillors on Bromley Council: the first non-Conservative party candidates returned for the ward were Chislehurst Matters members elected in 2022.

Geography
Chislehurst is largely a residential area. Chislehurst West, previously known as "Pricking" or "Prickend", includes the biggest of the ponds and the High Street.

Chislehurst is one of the starting points for the Green Chain Walk, linking to places such as Crystal Palace, Erith, the Thames Barrier and Thamesmead.

Chislehurst Common (and nearby St Paul's Cray Common) were saved from development in 1888 following campaigns by local residents. They were a popular destination for bank holiday trips in the early 20th century, and now provide a valuable green space. Nearby Petts Wood, Hawkwood and Scadbury have also been preserved as open spaces following local campaigns.

Chislehurst Conservation Area

A 2017 list shows there have been  in Chislehurst designated as conservation areas since 1971. The designation of conservation areas is one of the many planning tactics used in the United Kingdom that includes local planning authorities (LPA's), with plans working in conjunction such as the listing of buildings and scheduled monuments, metropolitan Green Belts, National Trusts, and "Tree Preservation Orders". These give stringent policies against development with statues and non-statutory orders. The destruction of many trees and Victorian style buildings caused by bombing during WWII, as well as the ensuing building boom, made protection even more critical. The end result is the protection of areas by preventing arbitrary destruction from large as well as small-scale development that can cause a creeping effect into side spaces and back gardens.

Nearby areas
Chislehurst borders New Eltham to the north, Sidcup to the north east and east, St Paul's Cray to the south east, Petts Wood to the south, Bickley to the south west, Elmstead to the west and Mottingham to the north west.

Landmarks

Chislehurst Caves

A local attraction is Chislehurst Caves. They were originally used to mine flint and chalk. During World War II, they were used nightly as an air-raid shelter. There is a chapel inside. A child was born in the caves during World War II and was given a middle name of 'Cavena'.  The caves have also been used as a venue for live music; Jimi Hendrix, the Who, the Rolling Stones, David Bowie, Pink Floyd and Led Zeppelin have all played there.

Camden Place

Camden Place (now Chislehurst Golf Club, 51° 24′ 40.05″N 0° 3′ 55.69″E ) takes its name from the antiquary William Camden, who lived in the former house on the site from c. 1609 until his death in 1623. The present house was built shortly before 1717, and it was given a number of additions in the late 18th and very early 19th centuries by the architect George Dance the younger.

In about 1760, the house and estate were bought by Charles Pratt, the Attorney General, and later Lord Chancellor. Pratt was ennobled in 1765, taking the title Baron Camden, of Camden Place; in 1786, he was created Earl Camden. The house is a Grade II* listed building.

A later occupant of the house, from 1871 until his death there in 1873, was the exiled French Emperor, Napoleon III. His body and that of his son, the Prince Imperial, were originally buried in St Mary's Church, before being removed to St Michael's Abbey, Farnborough. The Emperor's widow, the Empress Eugénie, remained at Camden Place until 1885.

There is a memorial to the Prince Imperial on Chislehurst Common, and the area's connections with the imperial family are found in many road names and in the local telephone code, 467, which in its earlier format corresponded to the letters IMP (for imperial).

Transport

Rail
Chislehurst station provides the town with National Rail services to London Charing Cross, London Cannon Street via Lewisham, Orpington and Sevenoaks.

Bus
Chislehurst is served by London Buses routes 61, 160, 161, 162, 269, 273, 638, R7 & N136. These connect it with areas including Beckenham, Bexleyheath, Bromley, Catford, Eltham, Grove Park, Lewisham, North Greenwich, Orpington, Sidcup & Woolwich.

Education
 Bullers Wood School 
 Chislehurst School for Girls
 Coopers School
 Saint Nicholas Church of England Primary School
 Babington House School
 Farringtons School
 Chislehurst C of E Primary School
 Edgebury Primary School
 Red Hill Primary School
 Mead Road Infant School
 Marjorie McClure Special School

Religious sites

 Chislehurst Baptist Church
 St Patrick's Catholic Church
 Christ Church Chislehurst
 Elmstead Baptist Church
 Chislehurst Methodist Church
 The Annuncation
 St. Nicholas
 Darul Uloom Mosque and School
 Ichthus Christian Fellowship
 Sidemen House
 St Mary's Roman Catholic Church, original burial place of Napoleon III and his son, the Prince Imperial

Notable people

 Louis-Napoleon Bonaparte, President of France and Emperor of the French, lived in exile (1871-1873) in Camden Place.
 William Camden (1551–1623), Clarenceux King of Arms, lived in the house later known as Camden Place from c.1609 until 1623
 Malcolm Campbell, former land and water speed record holder, was born in Chislehurst and is buried in St. Nicholas Parish Church
 George Somers Leigh Clarke (1822–1882), architect who lived at Walpole, Manor Park and is buried in the St Nicholas' churchyard.
 Richmal Crompton, author of the Just William series of books.
Craig Fairbrass, actor
 Tilly Keeper, who plays Louise Mitchell in BBC One soap opera EastEnders.
 E. J. May (1853–1941), architect, lived locally and designed a number of local buildings.
 Eugénie de Montijo, Countess of Teba and Empress of France.
 Jozef Michal Poniatowski, Polish nobleman, composer.
 Charles Pratt (1714–1794), Earl Camden, a British politician and judge, who lived at Camden Place
 Peter Redpath, Canadian businessman.
 Siouxsie Sioux, singer, best known for being in the band Siouxsie and the Banshees
 Thomas Townshend, 1st Viscount Sydney; the city of Sydney, Australia is named after him.
 Francis Walsingham, spymaster to Elizabeth I.
 Alan Watts, philosopher, born and raised in Chislehurst, moved to the United States in 1938.
 William Willett, a campaigner for daylight saving time, lived most of his adult life in Chislehurst.
 Ted Willis, creator of Dixon of Dock Green.
 William Hyde Wollaston, chemist and physicist who discovered rhodium and palladium.

References

 
Areas of London
Districts of the London Borough of Bromley
Former civil parishes in the London Borough of Bromley